Magleš (Serbian Cyrillic: Маглеш) is a mountain in western Serbia, near the city of Valjevo. Its highest peak Pali has an elevation of 1,036 meters above sea level.

References

Mountains of Serbia